Bernice Loren (1920 – May 4, 2010) was a well known American actress, director, teacher and mentor to many actors, best known for an inspirational combined performance technique, "emanating from a place of unity,"

Biography 
Bernice Loren co-founded with Roland F. Bernhagen and Marilyn Lief Kramberg Expressions, a not-for-profit theatre school:
"I developed something of a crusading spirit about the quality of theatre and of theatre practice. I think acting is at its most exciting and rewarding when, along with the ability to communicate with and affect the audience, there is a characterization so full and true that the actor may not even be recognizable from role to role."

Her initial theatre training was with Erwin Piscator and included studies with Lee Strasberg, Reiken Ben-Ari, Valerie Bettis, Marian Rich, and many others. Throughout her professional career she has continued to study, experiment, and do research for her work. From a throughout background in Stanislavski’s approach she went on to investigate various acting methods and styles, performing under and observing foreign specialists at work, among them Ono’é Baiko VII, George Devine, Yuri Zavadasky, Dimitros Rondiris, Jacques Charon. To modern dance instruction she added ballet, period manners and movement (William Burdick), Mensendieck, Yoga (Acharya and Hatha), and T’ai Chi Ch’uan. Voice and speech training was extended to include dialect studies (Milenko Rado) and singing (Margaret McCulloch).

Miss Loren has played over forty roles Off-Broadway and in stock and resident theatres. She has directed over twenty-five plays Off-Broadway, in stock, and in community theatres. She has taught acting, voice and speech, and movement in resident theatre companies, City College, and community theatres. As co-founder-director-manager with Marilyn Lief of a summer stock theatre in East Jordan, Michigan she was involved in every aspect of theatre work, onstage and backstage, in addition to teaching apprentices. As the director of the Professional Workshop of stage 73 she helped to formulate its experimental program, selected Workshop personnel by auditioning a large body of actors and interviewing numerous directors, and also directed along-run children’s play. She is the author of a text on voice and speech, Effective Speaking, and has written plays, stories, articles, and poems.

Famous Works

Debut 
Karen André, Night of January 16, Center Stage, East Jordan, MI, 1948.
New York Debut: Calpurnia, Julius Caesar, Everyman's Theatre, 1951.

Principal Stage Appearances
Ruth, Blithe Spirit, 1948; Judith, Hay Fever, 1949; Toinette, The Imaginary Invalid, 1949; Tracy, The Philadelphia Story, 1949; Marian, Parlor Story, Miriam, Guest in the House, 1949—all at Center Stage, East Jordan, MI; Mrs. Brown, Claudia, Centre Playhouse, Rockville Centre, NY, 1950; Veta Louise, Harvey, Palm Tree Playhouse, Sarasota, FL, 1952; Anne, The Milky Way, Palm Tree Playhouse, Sarasota, FL, 1952; Sue, All My Sons, Palm Tree Playhouse, Sarasota, FL1952; Tatiana, The Anniversary, Contemporary, New York, 1955; Marguerite Ida/Helena Annabel, Doctor Faustus Lights the Lights, Carnegie Chapter Hall, New York, 1958; Aunt Sarah, One Foot in America, Brooklyn Academy of Music, 1959; Chorus of Women, Electra, IASTA, New York, 1961; Eurydice, Antigone, Stage 73, New York, 1966.

Directed
All My Sons, 1948; Voice of the Turtle, 1948; Arsenic and Old Lace, 1948; Angel Street, 1949; Home of the Brave, 1949; My Sister Eileen, 1949; The Importance of Being Earnest, 1949; Guest in the House, 1949—all at Center Stage, East Jordan, MI; Hello Out There, Equity Library, New York, 1954; The Enchanted Forest, Stage 73, New York, 1962; Aspects of Theatre, Expressions Theatre, New York, 1964; Theatre Offerings, Expressions Theatre, New York, 1976.

Television Debut
The Marble Faun.

Related Theatrical Career
Teaching Theatre - City College of New York, 1955–68; School for Creative Communication, New York, 1982–2010; Expressions, School for Theatre Arts, New York, 1972-2010.

Books
Toward Greater Theatre Appreciation, 1954; Effective Speaking, 1963.

Students of Bernice Loren 

 Pauline Hahn
 Dirk Weiler
 G. Beaudin

External links 
thedramaloft
Film Reference

American stage actresses
American theatre directors
Women theatre directors
American acting coaches
2010 deaths
1920 births
21st-century American women